Auto driver or Auto Driver may refer to:
 Auto Driver, a 1998 Telugu romance film
 Auto Driver (2015 film), an Indian documentary
 Auto driver, a driver in auto racing
 Auto driver, a driver of an auto rickshaw

See also
 Auto (disambiguation)
 Driver (disambiguation)
 Self-driving car